Rupert Burt Brownlees (26 April 1888 – 2 February 1960) was an Australian rules footballer who played with Geelong in the Victorian Football League (VFL).

Notes

External links 

Rupe Brownlees's profile at Australianfootball.com

1888 births
1960 deaths
Australian rules footballers from Victoria (Australia)
Australian Rules footballers: place kick exponents
Geelong Football Club players
Australian rules footballers from South Australia